WACE (730 kHz) is an AM radio radio station broadcasting a Catholic radio radio format.  Licensed to Chicopee, Massachusetts, United States, the station serves the Springfield radio market and has been permitted to identify itself as "Chicopee-Springfield" since 1969.  The station is owned by Holy Family Communications, and operates as part of its The Station of the Cross network.

History
On December 1, 1946, WACE first signed on the air. It was owned by the Regional Broadcasting Company on Chicopee Street in Chicopee.  The station broadcast at 1,000 watts by day; because AM 730 is a clear channel frequency, reserved for CKAC in Montreal and XEX in Mexico City, WACE was a daytimer, signing off at sunset to prevent interference.  In the 1960s the power was increased to 5,000 watts; while it remained a daytime-only station, its pre-sunrise power of 8 watts enabled the station to be heard as far away as Hartford, Connecticut, due to the transmitter's location on the banks of the Connecticut River. (In 1986 the station was allowed to operate at 8 watts at night as well.) At full power the signal could be heard as distantly as Rhode Island.

During the 1970s, the station broadcast a popular oldies format.  Among its personalities were Charlie (Ahl) Day, later of WCBS-FM in New York and WOMC in Detroit, and Mike Adams, for many years a popular sports-talk radio and TV host in Boston. The station also featured a 3-hour morning news block anchored by Day and Don Yankee. In 1977, Ace Broadcasting bought the station.  As music listening shifted to FM radio, the new owners tried an all-news radio format, as a network affiliate of CBS Radio News.

The news format did not last very long and by 1980, WACE was airing religious programming, where national preachers bought blocks of time on the station to discuss their faith and seek donations.

On May 1, 2022, WACE went off the air, and filed a STA to relocate to a new transmitter site, which will be on the tower that WMAS-FM, WHLL and W251CT uses. In August 2022, Holy Family Communications, a Roman Catholic broadcaster operating as The Station of the Cross, agreed to purchase the station from Carter Broadcasting; it relaunched WACE as part of its Catholic radio network on January 23, 2023.

References

External links

Radio stations established in 1946
Chicopee, Massachusetts
1946 establishments in Massachusetts
Catholic radio stations
Christian radio stations in Massachusetts